Balef Kola-ye Sharqi (also Romanized as Bālef Kolā-ye Sharqī) is a village in Babol Kenar Rural District, Babol Kenar District, Babol County, Mazandaran Province, Iran. At the 2006 census, its population was 342, in 116 families.

References 

Populated places in Babol County